The Ernst Busch Academy of Dramatic Arts (German: Hochschule für Schauspielkunst Ernst Busch, HFS), based in the Niederschöneweide district of Berlin, Germany, was founded in 1951 as the National Theatre School in Berlin with the status of college. In 1981, it was granted university status, and a year later it was renamed after the singer and East German actor Ernst Busch.

History
The roots of the university go back to the Max Reinhardt drama school established in 1905 at the Deutsches Theater in Berlin. As was usual at that time, it was a private institution. The first training facility was the ground floor of the Palais Wesendonkschen, In den Zelten 21, where Reinhardt lived, near the Reichstag.

Reinhardt emigrated in 1933 and the Nazis took over the theatre along with the acting school. The director of the Deutsches Theater, Heinz Hilpert, secured subsidies for the first time in the school's history, but struggled to keep the school open. His work has been considered comparable to that of Gustaf Gründgens. After 1945, Boleslaw Barlog was rebuilding the theater world in West Berlin; Gustav von Wangenheim, returned from exile in Russia, became director of the Deutsches Theater, shortly followed by Wolfgang Langhoff, who held the position for many years. Teaching was resumed from July 1946, subsidized by the city of Berlin. After the currency reform of 1948, the school used rooms of the destroyed Schiller Theater in the west of the city.

State Drama School
The State Drama School of Berlin was conceptually and legally established as a public institution in September 1951. In a conscious departure from previous practice, the somewhat remote training center known as the Old Boat House in Niederschöneweide, in East Berlin, was chosen. Work on a new building started in 1979 and was completed in 1981. During this time, the school was in a school building in Marzahn. Major teachers were Rudolf Penka and Kurt Veth (both directors of the school), Wolfgang Engel, Thomas Langhoff, Ursula Karusseit, Hans-Georg Simmgen, and Jutta Hoffmann; others included dance teacher Hilde Buchenwald and, as a speech trainer, the poet Karl Mickel. In East Germany, the school was considered a hotbed of talent.

Present day
About 90 students are enrolled at the drama school in drama, puppetry, directing and dance. The university uses the Berlin Workers' Theatre as a venue. Every year, about 15 productions are staged. The Ernst Busch Academy of Dramatic Arts Berlin is a member institution of the Permanent Conference of actor training (SKS).

In 2004, the university won the Berlin Art Prize and became widely known due to the long-term documentary Addicted to Acting by Andres Veiel (1997–2004). A political storm arose in June 2005 over the appointment of sociologist Wolfgang Engler as rector of the university. He succeeded Klaus Völker, who had led the school since 1993. The institute was awarded the 2010 "Film Culture Award in Mannheim-Heidelberg", which the International Filmfestival Mannheim-Heidelberg awards to companies, institutions, and individuals who have rendered outstanding service continuously over many years to film culture in Germany.

, the academy has relocated to the former theatre workshops of Berlin, with purpose-built conversions and extensions of the building.

Notable alumni
Reinhardt's students from 1905 to 1933 included:

Graduates from 1933–50 included:
 Gerhard Meyer
 Irma Münch
 Wilhelm Koch-Hooge
 Herbert Köfer
 Hans-Joachim Kulenkampff

Notable alumni since 1951 include:

Manfred Krug and Jens Hoffmann enrolled but did not complete the full training.

See also
 Gerhard Ebert

References

Further reading
 Steve Earnest, The state acting academy of East Berlin: a history of actor training from Max Reinhart's [sic] Schauspielschule to the Hochschule für Schauspielkunst "Ernst Busch", Lewiston, New York: Edwin Mellen Press, 1999.

External links
  
 Alumni website
 Gerhard Ebert: 100 years of drama school in Berlin

 
1951 establishments in Germany
Drama schools in Germany
Universities and colleges in Berlin
Educational institutions established in 1951